Vampire fish is a colloquial name given to the following varieties of fish:

 Candiru (fish) (Vandellia cirrhosa), a species of parasitic freshwater catfish
 Payara, a species of dogtooth tetra
 Sea lamprey, a parasitic lamprey

See also
 Dracula fish (Danionella dracula)
 Vampire squid (Vampyroteuthis infernalis)
 Vampyronassa rhodanica ("vampire fish trap"), an extinct cephalopod